Anatomical "lines", or "reference lines," are theoretical lines drawn through anatomical structures and are used to describe anatomical location. The following reference lines are identified in Terminologia Anatomica:
 Anterior median line
 Lateral sternal line: A vertical line corresponding to the lateral margin of the sternum.
 Parasternal line: A vertical line equidistant from the sternal and mid-clavicular lines.
 Mid-clavicular line: A vertical line passing through the midpoint of the clavicle.
 Mammillary line
 Anterior axillary line: A vertical line on the anterior torso marked by the anterior axillary fold.
 Midaxillary line: A vertical line passing through the apex of the axilla.
 Posterior axillary line: A vertical line passing through the posterior axillary fold.
 Scapular line: A vertical line passing through the inferior angle of the scapula.
 Paravertebral line: A vertical line corresponding to the tips of the transverse processes of the vertebrae.
 Posterior median line

Other anatomical lines include:
 Mid-pupillary line: A line running vertically down the face through the midpoint of the pupil when looking directly forward.
 Mid-inguinal point: A point midway between the anterior superior iliac spine and the pubic symphysis.
 Intercristal line: A transverse line passing across the lumbar spine between the superior aspects of the iliac crests.
 Mid-dorsal line: The intersection between the dorsal skin and the median plane.
 Mid-ventral line: The intersection between the ventral skin and the median plane.

See also
 Axillary lines
 Anatomical plane

lines